Ulf Henrik Palme (18 October 1920 – 12 May 1993) was a Swedish film actor. He was born in Stockholm and died in Ingarö.

Partial filmography

 Black Roses (1945) - Gunnar Bergström
 The Serious Game (1945) - Ture Törne
 Möte i natten (1946) - Sune
 Sunshine Follows Rain (1946) - Mats, deras son
 Soldier's Reminder (1947) - Jerker
 Crime in the Sun (1947) - Rickard
 On These Shoulders (1948) - Kjell Loväng
 Prison (1949) - Man in Birgitta's Dream (uncredited)
 Realm of Man (1949) - Kjell Arvid Loväng
 Only a Mother (1949) - Hammar
 Girl with Hyacinths (1950) - Anders Wikner - Author
 While the City Sleeps (1950) - Kalle Lund
 This Can't Happen Here (1950) - Atkä Natas
 Miss Julie (1951) - Jean
 In the Arms of the Sea (1951) - Bo Winner
 Barabbas (1953) - Barabbas
 Our Father and the Gypsy (1954) - David Vallander
 Karin Månsdotter (1954) - Göran Persson
 Ung man söker sällskap (1954) - Albert Hansson
 Sir Arne's Treasure (1954) - Sir Archie
 Wild Birds (1955) - Harry
 Dreams (1955) - Mr. Henrik Lobelius
 La Sorcière (1956) - Matti
 Tarps Elin (1956) - Kjell Loväng
 Woman in a Fur Coat (1958) - Arvid Croneman
 The Judge (1960) - Psychiatrist
 The Counterfeit Traitor (1962) - Max Gumpel
 Hide and Seek (1963) - Roger
 Il diavolo (1963) - Il pastore protestante
 Heja Roland! (1966) - Ö.J.
 Här har du ditt liv (1966) - Larsson
 Rooftree (1967) - Leo Wittö
 Doctor Glas (1968) - Rev. Gregorius, Helga's husband
 The Girls (1968) - Director
 Rötmånad (1970) - Richard
 Lockfågeln (1971) - Liljesparre (police officer)
 The Day the Clown Cried (1972) - Johann Keltner
 Smutsiga fingrar (1973) - Swahn, corrupt lawyer
 Fru Inger til Østråt (1975) - Peder Kanzler
 Drömmen om Amerika (1976) - Narrator (voice)
 Bang! (1977) - Johnny
 Marmalade Revolution (1980) - Per Hugo

References

External links

1920 births
1993 deaths
Swedish male film actors
Male actors from Stockholm
Eugene O'Neill Award winners
20th-century Swedish male actors